Marsett is one of three settlements in around Semer Water in Raydale, a small side dale off Wensleydale in North Yorkshire, England. Marsett is only a hamlet and lies to the south-west of the lake, at a point where a smaller side dale, Bardale, joins Raydale.

The hamlet consists of two farms and ten permanent dwellings, together with a number of holiday cottages.  There is also a Methodist chapel, built in 1897.
 
The name, first recorded in 1283 as Mouressate, is from the Old Norse Maures sætr, meaning 'the shieling of a man named Maurr' (a nickname meaning 'ant').

In 2016, Marsett's red telephone box was scheduled to be demolished, but following a successful campaign where local councillors pointed out that there is no mobile phone reception in the area, it was renovated instead. The phone box has also been earmarked as a possible location for a defibrillator unit.

References

External links

Villages in North Yorkshire
Wensleydale